The dusky white-eye (Zosterops finschii) is a species of bird in the family Zosteropidae. It is endemic to Palau.

Its natural habitat is subtropical or tropical moist lowland forests.

References

Zosteropidae
Birds of Palau
Endemic birds of Palau
Endemic fauna of Palau
Near threatened animals
Near threatened biota of Oceania
Birds described in 1868
Taxonomy articles created by Polbot